Kanstancyja Bujło (1893–1986) was a Belarusian poet and playwright.

Bujło's first publication in 1909 was Mound Flower, edited by Janka Kupała. The main themes of her poems, which often relied on folklore, were on peasant life in Belarus before 1917, and World War II heroism. One of her most notable poems was I Love Our Land.

References

Belarusian women poets
Belarusian dramatists and playwrights
1893 births
1986 deaths
20th-century Belarusian poets
20th-century dramatists and playwrights
Women dramatists and playwrights
20th-century women writers
Soviet women writers
Soviet writers